Andreas Kronthaler (born 26 January 1966) is an Austrian creative director and design partner. He is the widower of the late fashion designer Vivienne Westwood.

Early life 
Kronthaler was born in Tyrol, Austria.

In 1980, he went to  Ortwein art school in Graz, Austria, where he spent five years training to be a jeweler. During this time, he began to experiment with fashion, making clothes at home to be sold to friends and in local stores.

He studied Industrial Design at the University of Applied Arts Vienna and switched to fashion design.

Career 
In 1988, Kronthaler met Vivienne Westwood while she was teaching fashion design at the Vienna School of Applied Art. In 1989, he moved to London to work for her firm. Their first joint collection was the Spring–Summer 1991 collection: Cut and Slash. In this collection, Kronthaler presented Renaissance-inspired gowns – later named the Sun Wheel dress.

Kronthaler and Westwood married in 1992. They continued to develop collections together. They were married until Westwood's death on 29 December 2022.

For the wedding of the imprisoned journalist and founder of WikiLeaks Julian Assange to Stella Morris in March 2022 in Belmarsh Prison, the groom wore an outfit based on a Scottish kilt and the bride a dress with a graffiti application, both designs by Kronthaler and his wife, Vivienne Westwood.

Andreas Kronthaler for Vivienne Westwood
While Kronthaler initially was a silent design partner and creative director, in 2016 Westwood acknowledged his commitment and influence on the Gold Label collection over 25 years by renaming the line Andreas Kronthaler for Vivienne Westwood.

References 

Living people
1966 births
People from Tyrol (state)
University of Applied Arts Vienna alumni
Austrian fashion designers